1972 in the Philippines details events of note that happened in the Philippines in the year 1972.

Incumbents

 President: Ferdinand Marcos (Nacionalista Party)
 Vice President: Fernando Lopez (Nacionalista Party) (until September 23)
 House Speaker: Cornelio Villareal 
 Chief Justice: Roberto Concepcion
 Congress: 7th (until September 23)

Events

June
 June 25 – Typhoon Konsing landfalls on Luzon. It caused 131 deaths and $15 million worth of damage (year 1972).

July
 July 5 – A team of Philippine Constabulary elements discovers in the shoreline of Digoyo Point in Palanan, Isabela the MV Karagatan which providing supplies to the New People's Army. The outnumbered team is later involved in a three-day gunfight with the NPA, with two Constabulary men injured and preventing the NPA from taking the ship. The operation captured several firearms and ammunition. The incident is one of the reasons of the imposition of Martial Law.

September
 September 21
 Martial law is declared by President Marcos as Proclamation No. 1081 signed by law led to the establishment of his dictatorship and was simulcasted through national radio and television broadcasts nationwide by midnight of September 23, causing series of round-ups by police and military forces, forced ban on public rallies, tight security, strict censorship on all forms of mass media, closures of business establishments and dissolution of bicameral congress (senate and house of representatives); as well as arrest of critiques of Marcoses (like media people and politicians), notable people who are arrested such as Ka Louie Beltran, Maximo Soliven, Satur Ocampo, Benigno Aquino Jr., Chino Roces (the founder of Manila Times and ABC-5) and the Lopez family (of ABS-CBN and Manila Chronicle, including Eugenio Lopez, Sr.)
 The celebration of Thanksgiving Day as a regular holiday is moved to September 21 from every fourth Thursday of November.
 September 22 –  Assassination attempt of Defense Minister Juan Ponce Enrile.
 September 23
 Senator Benigno Aquino Jr. was arrested.
 ABC 5 (Associated Broadcasting Corporation, now TV5 Network) and ABS-CBN shut down radio-television operations due to Martial law.
 Manila Chronicle shuts down newspaper operations.

Holidays

As per Act No. 2711 section 29, issued on March 10, 1917, any legal holiday of fixed date falls on Sunday, the next succeeding day shall be observed as legal holiday. Sundays are also considered legal religious holidays. Bonifacio Day was added through Philippine Legislature Act No. 2946. It was signed by then-Governor General Francis Burton Harrison in 1921. On October 28, 1931, the Act No. 3827 was approved declaring the last Sunday of August as National Heroes Day. As per Republic Act No. 3022, April 9th was proclaimed as Bataan Day. Independence Day was changed from July 4 (Philippine Republic Day) to June 12 (Philippine Independence Day) on August 4, 1964.

 January 1 – New Year's Day
 February 22 – Legal Holiday
 March 30 – Maundy Thursday
 March 31 – Good Friday
 April 9 – Bataan Day
 May 1 – Labor Day
 June 12 – Independence Day 
 July 4 – Philippine Republic Day
 August 13  – Legal Holiday
 August 27 – National Heroes Day
 November 23 – Thanksgiving Day
 November 30 – Bonifacio Day
 December 25 – Christmas Day
 December 30 – Rizal Day

Entertainment and culture

Sports
 March 20–28 – Marikina hosts the 1972 ISF Men's World Championship in which ten nations participated.
 August 26–September 10 – The country participates in the 1972 Summer Olympics in Munich, West Germany.

Births
January 30 – Zoren Legaspi, Filipino actor and film director
March 15 – Michelle van Eimeren, Australian beauty queen and actress
March 21 – Mikee Romero, Filipino businessman and politician
April 27 – Manilyn Reynes, Filipina actress and singer
April 28 – Romnick Sarmenta, Filipino actor
May 3 – Wally Bayola, Filipino comedian and actor
May 8 – Candy Pangilinan, Filipino actress and comedian
June 25 – Chokoleit, comedian (d. 2019)
July 15 – Sonny Angara, Filipino politician
July 26 – Ramil Hernandez, Filipino politician
August 23 – Bal David, Filipino basketball player
September 11 – Mujiv Hataman, Filipino politician
September 12 – Jeffrey Cariaso, Filipino basketball player and coach
October 7 – Marlou Aquino, Filipino basketball player
October 10 – Jun Lana, Filipino playwright and screenwriter
November 10 – Carlos Celdran, cultural activist and performance artist (d. 2019)
November 21 – John Rey Tiangco, Filipino politician
December 11 – Janette Garin, physician and politician

Deaths
April 26 – Fernando Amorsolo, portraitist and painter of rural Philippine landscapes (1972 National Artist of the Philippines) (b. 1892)
December 6 – José Zulueta, lawyer and politician (b. 1889)

References